Swen is a mass mailing computer worm written in C++. It sends an email which contains the installer for the virus, disguised as a Microsoft Windows update, although it also works on P2P filesharing networks, IRC and newsgroups' websites. It was first analyzed on September 18, 2003, however, it might have infected computers before then. It disables firewalls and antivirus programs.

Infection

Self-installation
The virus first sends itself via email with an attachment, posing as an update for Windows. The attachment can have a .com, .scr, .bat, .pif, or .exe file extension. If its file name starts with the letters P, Q, U, or I, It displays a fake Microsoft Update dialogue box, asking if the user wants to install a Microsoft Security Update with the two choices "Yes" and "No". If the user presses "Yes", it displays a fake progress bar while installing the fake update. When finished, it displays another dialogue box saying: Microsoft Internet Update Pack This has been successfully installed. The malware then re-executes itself, followed by yet another dialogue box saying: Microsoft Security Update Pack This update does not need to be installed on this system. If the user chooses "No", the malware will still install itself silently in the background. Next, it checks for certain criteria by opening another dialogue box, prompting the user for their email address, username, password, SMTP and POP3 server addresses. The virus finally moves all information to the copy and terminates.

Autostart
The worm creates the following registry entry to execute upon startup:

References
Trend Micro Threat Encyclopedia | WORM_SWEN.A
BitDefender Virus Information for Swen.A@mm

Email worms
Hacking in the 2000s